St Barnabas Anglican Church, Broadway, is an Anglican church in the Diocese of Sydney, New South Wales, Australia. The church property is located on Broadway, near the University of Sydney and University of Technology, Sydney.

Commonly called "Barneys", the church is well known in Sydney for its church signs, including a celebrated "battle" with the publican across the road. The church would put up one sign and the hotel would have another with a witty reply to the church's sign. Some of the signs attracted the attention of the Sydney media.

Arthur Stace, the "Eternity" man, was a member of the church.

History 
Built by slum labourers in the Inner West region of Sydney, the foundation stone for the building was laid in 1858. Much later, some of the land in front of the church was sold and became the site of a commercial building in the Beaux-Arts style.

2006: fire and destruction 
A fire ravaged the church building at 3.30 am on 10 May 2006. It took firefighters around eight hours to completely contain the fire. Destroyed in the fire were a 100-year-old pipe organ, a historic stained-glass window (valued in the media at over a million dollars) and memorials to parishioners who died in World War I.

The investigation concluded that the fire was probably started at the power box. No accelerants were found, indicating that arson was not a cause.

2010: demolition of old church building and rebuilding 
The old church building was demolished in 2010 and the new building, designed by Sydney architects Francis-Jones Morehen Thorp, was opened in June 2012.

The new church building also houses a social community centre and creche. It was awarded a High Commendation (buildings of religion) at the 2013 World Architecture Festival in Singapore and the 2013 International Architecture Award.

Ministry 
The senior minister since 2010 is the Reverend Mike Paget. Other senior ordained staff include Jason Cheng, Erica Hamence and Rhys Duggan. St Barnabas' also employs a music director, Steve Crain, and a substantial ministry team.

Previous ministers at the church include:
 Ian Powell, evangelist
 Robert Forsyth, Bishop of South Sydney
 Peter Jensen, Archbishop of Sydney
 Paul Barnett, Christian scholar, historian and bishop
 R. B. S. Hammond (started the tradition of the church's sign)
 Howard Guinness, student ministry pioneer (related to Arthur Guinness, founder of Guinness Beer)
 W. A. Charlton

"Eternity" 
Arthur Stace, a member of the congregation, attracted attention for writing the word "eternity" in chalk on the streets of Sydney from the 1940s through to the 1960s in a distinctive copperplate style. "Eternity" was featured on the Sydney Harbour Bridge during the 2000 New Year's celebrations.

A documentary about Stace, called Eternity, by Lawrence Johnston was released in 1994.

Battle of the signs 
R. B. S Hammond began the weekly ritual of the St. Barnabas message board. His witty and often thought provoking messages were what made St Barnabas famous. Some include; "Drink and trouble are like petrol and fire", "Alcohol makes your mind stagger long before your feet do", "Do not nurse a grievance, teach it to walk" and "Divorce is the hash we make from domestic scraps". Continuing on the tradition was Robert Forsyth, who found that he had competition from Arthur Elliot, publican of the nearby pub, Broadway Hotel. The two noticeboards would often display subtle wordplay. Here are some of them:

 St Barnabas: "This church is for sinners"
 Broadway Hotel: "This pub is for drinkers"
 St Barnabas: "Money does not make you happy"
 Broadway Hotel: "I'd rather be rich and happy than poor and happy"
 St Barnabas: "God made sex for marriage not for money"
 Broadway Hotel: "Wish he had made money for marriage"
 St Barnabas: "Free Grace brothers and sisters" (St Barnabas was next to a Grace Brothers store)
 Broadway Hotel: "Free David Jones too" (referring to another Australian department store)
 St Barnabas: "The best things in life aren't things"
 Broadway Hotel: "Things are not all what they seem to be"

Nowadays and perhaps somewhat ironically, after some services, particularly the later services, parishioners share fellowship with each other at the pub opposite St. Barnabas.

Gallery

See also 

 Australian non-residential architectural styles
 List of Anglican churches in the Diocese of Sydney

References

External links 

 
 Anglican Diocese of Sydney
 St Barnabas Broadway Soccer Club
 Newly rebuilt St Barnabas Church on Broadway reopened – Daily Telegraph
 Message from a feisty congregation – we're back in the house – SMH
  [CC-By-SA]

Anglican church buildings in Sydney
Churches completed in 1858
Buildings and structures demolished in 2010
Destroyed churches in Australia
Former churches in Australia
Demolished buildings and structures in Sydney
Churches completed in 2012
Anglican Diocese of Sydney
21st-century Anglican church buildings
1858 establishments in Australia
19th-century Anglican church buildings
19th-century churches in Australia
21st-century churches in Australia